G. Puttaswamy Gowda (20 December 1935 - 18 August 2006) was an Indian politician and He represented Hassan in Lok Sabha the lower house of the Parliament of India. He defeated H.D. Deve Gowda, former prime minister of India in 13th Lok Sabha elections. He was a member of the Indian National Congress.

Early life and background 
Puttaswamy was born to Shri Patel Gidde Gowda and Smt. Sannamma on 20 December 1935, in Keragodu Hassan District of Karnataka. He completed his education Matriculate, Rashtra Bhasha Visharad from Bettadapura, Mysore District and Holenarsipura, Hassan District (Karnataka).

He served as a Member and President of the Taluk Development Board. He was also Director of H.D.C.C.Bank Limited in 1975 and Director of Karnataka State Co-Operative Marketing Federation.

Personal life 
G. Puttaswamy Gowda married Smt. P. Shantamma on 3 May 1962. The couple has 1 son and 1daughter.

Position held

References

Indian National Congress politicians from Karnataka
India MPs 1999–2004
2002 deaths
Lok Sabha members from Karnataka
1935 births